Ferenc Nagy (27 October 1916 – 11 May 1977) was a Hungarian boxer who competed in the 1936 Summer Olympics.

He was born in Cegléd.

In 1936 he finished fourth in the heavyweight class. After his win in the quarterfinals against Olle Tandberg he was neither able to fight in the semifinal bout to Herbert Runge nor in the bronze medal bout to Erling Nilsen.
He wasn't able to fight for the medal because he was locked in to the locker room and his trainer was ordered to throw in the towel. There was a clear political reason behind this and sadly the medal placement was already decided. 
See reference Cegled Sport torteneti Muzem**.

External links
 profile
sports-reference
 http://www.sportmuzeum.hu/?id1=sportgyujtemenyek&idcikk=680

1916 births
1977 deaths
Heavyweight boxers
Olympic boxers of Hungary
Boxers at the 1936 Summer Olympics
Hungarian male boxers
People from Cegléd
Sportspeople from Pest County